Cerithideopsilla conica is a species of small sea snail, a marine gastropod mollusk in the family Potamididae.

Taxonomy
Reid et al. (2008) moved Potamides conicus to the genus Cerithideopsilla based on the molecular phylogeny research. Other subsequent study also confirmed this placement within Cerithideopsilla.

Distribution
Distribution of Cerithideopsilla conica include Mediterranean and Indian Ocean.

This species occurs in or around:
 European waters
 Madagascar
 The Red Sea

Description
The shell can attain a length of 14 mm.has a siphonal notch in the lower margin of the opening and the shell is thick.

Ecology
The development of Cerithideopsilla conica non-planktotrophic.

Parasites of Cerithideopsilla conica include:
 Cerithideopsilla conica serves as the first intermediate host of Heterophyes heterophyes.

References

Further reading
 Dautzenberg, Ph. (1929). Mollusques testacés marins de Madagascar. Faune des Colonies Francaises, Tome III
 Vine, P. (1986). Red Sea Invertebrates. Immel Publishing, London. 224 pp
  Oliverio, Marco (2006). Gastropoda Prosobranchia Caenogastropoda, in: Revisione della Checklist della fauna marina italiana

External links

 Gastropods.com : Pirenella conica tricolor (f); accessed: 27 April 2011

Potamididae
Gastropods described in 1829